Guy de Luget (2 February 1884 – 22 September 1961) was a French fencer. He won a gold medal in the foil competition at the 1924 Summer Olympics.

References

External links
 

1884 births
1961 deaths
Sportspeople from La Rochelle
French male foil fencers
Olympic fencers of France
Fencers at the 1924 Summer Olympics
Olympic gold medalists for France
Olympic medalists in fencing
Medalists at the 1924 Summer Olympics
20th-century French people